The 2014 Girls' Youth South American Volleyball Championship was the 19th edition of the tournament, organised by South America's governing volleyball body, the Confederación Sudamericana de Voleibol (CSV).

Brazil girls won their 15th title in the Championship. The top three teams; Brazil, Argentina and Peru, qualified to the 2015 Youth World Championship.

Competing nations

Competition format
The 2014 Girls' Youth South American Volleyball Championship consisted of a single round-robin pool between the six teams, the champion was determined from the ranking after the round.

Competition

Venue: Coliseo Bicentenario de Morales, Tarapoto, Peru
All times are Peruvian Standard Time (UTC−05:00)

Final standing

All-Star Team

Most Valuable Player

Best Opposite

Best Outside Hitters

Best Middle Blockers

Best Setter

Best Libero

References

External links
CSV official website

2014
S
Volleyball
International volleyball competitions hosted by Peru